Dalibor may refer to:

Dalibor (name), Slavic surname and masculine given name
Dalibor (film), a 1956 Czech film
Dalibor (opera), 1868 opera by Bedřich Smetana, based on the life of Dalibor z Kozojed, the 15th century Czech knight